Capital punishment was abolished in the U.S. state of New Mexico in 2009.

The law replaced the death penalty for the most serious crimes with life imprisonment and life imprisonment without the possibility of parole. This makes New Mexico the fifteenth state in the U.S. to abolish capital punishment.

Since the death penalty was reinstated by the U.S. Supreme Court in 1976 (in the case of Gregg v. Georgia), only one person has been executed in New Mexico. This was Terry Clark, who was put to death in 2001, by lethal injection, for the murder of a child. The penalty was abolished by House Bill 2085, which was signed by Governor Bill Richardson on March 18, 2009 and came into force on July 1 of that year. Section 6 of the law states, "The provisions of this act apply to crimes committed on or after July 1, 2009".

Fate of remaining offenders still on death row
Because the legislation is not retroactive, it is still possible for convicts to be executed for crimes committed before July 1, 2009. For ten years after abolition, there were two men on death row in New Mexico whose crimes and trials took place before then:
Robert Ray Fry, bludgeoning and stabbing of a Shiprock woman in 2000 (he has also three other murder convictions).
Timothy Allen, for the kidnapping, rape, and murder by strangulation of a teenage girl in 1994

Both Allen and Fry filed petitions for writ of habeas corpus asserting that the death sentences in their cases are unconstitutional, both generally, and as applied to them individually. On June 28, 2019, their death sentences were overturned by the New Mexico Supreme Court, which in a split decision ruled that their sentences were disproportionate to their crimes. This effectively closes down New Mexico's death row unless another prisoner were to be tried, convicted and condemned for a homicide that occurred prior to 2009.

Only one death penalty trial has taken place since 2009 for crimes that were committed beforehand, that of Michael Astorga, and because the jurors in that case were unable to agree on a death sentence, he received life imprisonment.

Governor Martinez seeks reinstatement
Republican Governor Susana Martinez announced on August 17, 2016, that she will introduce legislation to reinstate the death penalty in the 2017 legislative session. On October 14, 2016, the New Mexico House of Representatives approved the bill on a 36-30 vote. The bill provided the death penalty for only three kinds of murder: child murder, murder of an on-duty police officer, and murder of a prison employee by an inmate. The bill died in the Democratic controlled New Mexico Senate.

See also 
 List of people executed in New Mexico
 List of death row inmates in New Mexico
 Crime in New Mexico
 Paula Angel, only woman to be executed in post-colonial New Mexico

References

External links 
Capital Punishment or Compassion - Executions in the State of New Mexico: The Death Penalty Since Territorial Days (2003)

 
New Mexico
New Mexico law